Lord Charles is a ventriloquism dummy built by Leonard Insull and used by ventriloquist Ray Alan.

Lord Charles may also refer to:

 Charles I, Lord of Monaco (died 1357), soldier and founder of the Grimaldi dynasty
 Charles II, Lord of Monaco (1555–1589)
 a nickname for the curveball

See also

 Charles Lord II (1928–1993), U.S. banker
 Charles R. Lord (1931–1993), U.S. intelligence officer
 
 
 King Charles (disambiguation)
 Prince Charles (disambiguation)
 Sir Charles (disambiguation)
 Charles (disambiguation)
 Lord (disambiguation)